Richard B. McCoy ( – October 18, 1902) was an American politician from Maryland. He served as a member of the Maryland House of Delegates, representing Harford County from 1860 to 1864.

Early life
Richard B. McCoy was born in Baltimore.

Career
McCoy served as a member of the Maryland House of Delegates, representing Harford County from 1860 to 1864. He was elected on the Know Nothing ticket.

McCoy was one of the original incorporators and served as a director of the Conowingo Bridge Company.

Personal life
McCoy had four daughters and three sons, Jennie, Priscilla, Helen, Nannie, David G., John G. and Richard B. Jr. He was a Quaker and abolitionist.

McCoy died October 18, 1902, at the age of 81, at the home of his brother in Dublin, Maryland.

References

Year of birth uncertain
1820s births
1902 deaths
Politicians from Baltimore
People from Harford County, Maryland
Maryland Know Nothings
Members of the Maryland House of Delegates
American Quakers
American abolitionists